Chochołów may refer to any of the two Polish rural settlements including: 

 Chochołów, Lesser Poland Voivodeship (southern Poland)
 Chochołów, Łódź Voivodeship (central Poland)